James Dale (6 March 1789 – 31 December 1828) was an English professional cricketer who played first-class cricket from 1823 to 1827.  He was mainly associated with Sussex and made 9 known appearances in first-class matches.

References

1789 births
1828 deaths
English cricketers
English cricketers of 1787 to 1825
English cricketers of 1826 to 1863
Sussex cricketers
People from Petworth